Uglich Reservoir or Uglichskoye Reservoir is an artificial lake in the upper part of the Volga River formed by the  Uglich Hydroelectric Station dam.

It was built in 1939 in the town of Uglich. It is located in Tver and Yaroslavl Oblasts in central Russia.

Description
The Uglich Reservoir has a surface area of 249 km2 and a water volume of 1.2 km3. Its length is 143 km, it maximum width is 5 km, and average depth is 5 m (with maximum depth equaling 23 m). The Uglich Reservoir was created for the benefit of transportation, energy, and water supply. It also performs seasonal flow regulation. The towns of Uglich, Kalyazin, and Kimry are located along the reservoir.

Consequences
The construction of the dam led to the 15th-century Intercession monastery in Uglich and 16th-century monastery in Kalyazin being submerged by the artificial lake. The Flooded Belfry is an example of a submerged landmark.

References

Reservoirs in Russia
Reservoirs in Tver Oblast
Reservoirs in Yaroslavl Oblast
RUglich